The  is a skyscraper located in Kagoshima, Kagoshima Prefecture, Japan. Construction of the 93-metre, 18-storey skyscraper was finished in 1996.

External links
  

Government buildings completed in 1996
Buildings and structures in Kagoshima
Government buildings in Japan
1996 establishments in Japan
Skyscraper office buildings in Japan